The 2016 Montreal Impact season was the club's 23rd season of existence, and their fifth in Major League Soccer, the top tier of the Canadian soccer pyramid. They advanced all the way to the conference final where they lost to Canadian rival Toronto FC.

Outside of MLS regular season play, the club participated in the 2016 Canadian Championship.

Background

Transfers

In

Out

Loans in

Loans out

Draft picks

International caps 
Players called for senior international duty during the 2016 season while under contract with the Montreal Impact.

Pre-season friendlies

Regular season friendlies

Major League Soccer

Review

Tables

Eastern Conference

Overall

Results summary

Fixtures & results

MLS Cup Playoffs

Canadian championship

Canadian Championship review

Canadian Championship results

Player information

Squad information

Squad and statistics

Appearances, minutes played, and goals scored

Top scorers 

{| class="wikitable sortable alternance"  style="font-size:85%; text-align:center; line-height:14px; width:60%;"
|-
!width=10|No.
!width=10|Nat.
! scope="col" style="width:275px;"|Player
!width=10|Pos.
!width=80|Major League Soccer
!width=80|Canadian Championship
!width=80|MLS Playoffs
!width=80|TOTAL
|-
|10||  || Ignacio Piatti                || MF ||17 || || 4||21
|-
|11||  || Didier Drogba                || FW ||10 ||1 || || 11
|-
|7||  || Dominic Oduro                || FW ||6 || ||2 || 8
|-
|21||  || Matteo Mancosu                || FW ||3 || || 4 || 7
|-
|19||  || Michael Salazar                || FW ||2 ||1 || || 3
|-
|6||  || Hassoun Camara                || DF ||2|| || || 2
|-
|14||  || Harry Shipp                || MF ||2 || || || 2
|-
|32||  || Lucas Ontivero                || MF ||2 || || || 2
|-
|2||  || Ambroise Oyongo                || DF || || ||1 || 1
|-
|18||  || Kyle Bekker                || MF ||1 || || || 1
|-
|23||  || Laurent Ciman                || DF || || ||1 || 1
|-
|24||  || Anthony Jackson-Hamel                || FW ||1 || || || 1
|-
|27||  || Johan Venegas                || MF ||1 || || || 1
|-
|30||  || Hernán Bernardello                || MF ||1 || || || 1
|-
|51||  || Maxim Tissot                || MF ||1 || || || 1
|- class="sortbottom"
| colspan="4"|Totals|| 49 || 2 ||12 ||63 

Italic: denotes player left the club during the season.

Top assists 

{| class="wikitable sortable alternance"  style="font-size:85%; text-align:center; line-height:14px; width:60%;"
|-
!width=10|No.
!width=10|Nat.
! scope="col" style="width:275px;"|Player
!width=10|Pos.
!width=80|Major League Soccer
!width=80|Canadian Championship
!width=80|MLS Playoffs
!width=80|TOTAL
|-
|7||  || Dominic Oduro                || FW ||6 || || 3|| 9
|-
|10||  || Ignacio Piatti                || MF ||6 || ||2 ||8
|-
|11||  || Didier Drogba                || FW ||6 || 1||1 || 8
|-
|2||  || Ambroise Oyongo                || DF ||5 || || 1|| 6
|-
|21||  || Matteo Mancosu                || FW ||4 || ||2 || 6
|-
|33||  || Marco Donadel                || MF ||4 || || 2 || 6
|-
|8||  || Patrice Bernier                || MF ||1 || || 2|| 3
|-
|14||  || Harry Shipp                || MF ||3 || || || 3
|-
|6||  || Hassoun Camara                || DF ||2 || || || 2
|-
|25||  || Donny Toia                || DF ||2 || || || 2
|-
|27||  || Johan Venegas                || MF ||1 || ||1 || 2
|-
|32||  || Lucas Ontivero                || MF ||2 || || || 2
|-
|30||  || Hernán Bernardello                || MF ||1 || || || 1
|-
|29||  || Eric Alexander                || MF ||1 || || || 1
|- class="sortbottom"
| colspan="4"|Totals|| 44 || 1 ||14 ||59 

Italic: denotes player left the club during the season.

Top minutes played 

{| class="wikitable sortable alternance"  style="font-size:85%; text-align:center; line-height:14px; width:60%;"
|-
!width=10|No.
!width=10|Nat.
!scope="col" style="width:275px;"|Player
!width=10|Pos.
!width=80|Major League Soccer
!width=80|Canadian Championship
!width=80|MLS Playoffs
!width=80|TOTAL
|-
|1||  || |Evan Bush                    || GK || 2932 || || 480 || 3412
|-
|10||  || Ignacio Piatti               || MF || 2818 || 90 || 474 || 3382
|-
|23||  || Laurent Ciman                || DF || 2484 ||  || 480 || 2964
|-
|6||  || Hassoun Camara                 || DF || 2249 || 180 || 471 || 2900
|-
|2||  || Ambroise Oyongo                 || DF || 2316 || 87 || 480 || 2883
|-
|7||  || Dominic Oduro                 || FW || 2028 || 100 || 464 || 2592
|-
|36||  || Víctor Cabrera || DF || 1926 || 90 || 480 || 2496
|-
|33||  || Marco Donadel     || MF || 1516|| || 468 || 1984
|-
|11||  || Didier Drogba                 || FW || 1650 || 180 || 76 || 1906
|-
|14||  || Harry Shipp                || MF || 1595 || 57|| 18 || 1670

Italic: denotes player left the club during the season.

Multi–goal games

Goals against average 

{| border="1" cellpadding="4" cellspacing="0" style="margin: 1em 1em 1em 1em 0; background: #f9f9f9; border: 1px #aaa solid; border-collapse: collapse; font-size: 95%; text-align: center;"
|-
| rowspan="2" style="width:1%; text-align:center;"|No.
| rowspan="2" style="width:70px; text-align:center;"|Nat.
| rowspan="2" style="width:44%; text-align:center;"|Player
| colspan="3" style="text-align:center;"|Total
| colspan="3" style="text-align:center;"|Major League Soccer
| colspan="3" style="text-align:center;"|Canadian Championship
| colspan="3" style="text-align:center;"|MLS Playoffs
|-
|MIN
|GA
|GAA
|MIN
|GA
|GAA
|MIN
|GA
|GAA
|MIN
|GA
|GAA
|-
| style="text-align: right;" |1
|
| style="text-align: left;" |Evan Bush
|3412
|60
|1.58
|2932
|50
|1.52
|0
|0
|0.00
|480
|10
|1.87
|-
| style="text-align: right;" |22
|
| style="text-align: left;" |Eric Kronberg
|308
|7
|2.05
|128
|3
|2.11
|180
|4
|2.00
|0
|0
|0.00
|-
| style="text-align: right;" |40
|
| style="text-align: left;" |Maxime Crépeau
|0
|0
|0.00
|0
|0
|0.00
|0
|0
|0.00
|0
|0
|0.00

Italic: denotes player left the club during the season.

Clean sheets 

{| class="wikitable sortable alternance"  style="font-size:85%; text-align:center; line-height:14px; width:60%;"
|-
!width=10|No.
!width=10|Nat.
! scope="col" style="width:275px;"|Player
!width=80|Major League Soccer
!width=80|Canadian Championship
!width=80|MLS Cup Playoffs
!width=80|TOTAL
|-
|1||  || Evan Bush                     || 6 || || 1  ||7
|-
|22||  || Eric Kronberg                     ||  || 1 ||  ||1
|- class="sortbottom"
| colspan="3"|Totals|| 6 || 1 ||1  || 8

Yellow and red cards

International roster slots 
Montreal has ten MLS International Roster Slots for use in the 2016 season. Each club in Major League Soccer is allocated eight international roster spots. Montreal has two extra spot from transactions with the Portland Timbers and Toronto FC.

Recognition

MLS Best XI

MLS Player of the Week

MLS Team of the Week

MLS Goal of the Week

MLS Save of the Week

References 

CF Montréal seasons
Montreal Impact
Montreal
Montreal Impact